"They're Red Hot" is a song written and performed by Delta blues musician Robert Johnson. The song was recorded on November 27, 1936, in an improvised studio in Gunter Hotel, San Antonio, Texas. Vocalion Records issued it on a 78 rpm record, with "Come On in My Kitchen" as the second side, in 1937.

Music historian Ted Gioia describes "They're Red Hot" as:

References

1937 songs
Red Hot Chili Peppers songs
Robert Johnson songs
Songs written by Robert Johnson
Hokum blues songs
Song recordings produced by Don Law
Vocalion Records singles